Philippe Sella (born 14 February 1962, in Tonneins) is French former rugby union player. He started as a rugby league junior in his home town before switching to rugby union. As a former French rugby union player, he held the record for most international appearances until beaten by Jason Leonard. He became a member of the International Rugby Hall of Fame in 1999, and the IRB Hall of Fame in 2008.
 
Sella joined Saracens in 1996 from French side Agen. He and Australian Michael Lynagh were the catalysts for Saracens as they made the transition into the professional era, and Sella's presence helped other players make up their minds about joining the up-and-coming club.

He made a then world record 111 appearances (or caps) for France, and is one of only five players to have scored a try in every game during a Five Nations season.

Sella was the linchpin in the midfield where he operated alongside stalwart Steve Ravenscroft. His experience, pace and vision helped Saracens to become a potent force in 1998 and his appetite for defence was amazing.

He scored the opening try in the Tetley's Bitter Cup final in the same year, a trademark Sella finish. He showed pace, power and vision to run, swivel and crash over the line with his try then signalling the way for the floodgates to open.

He retired from rugby union later that year at the age of 36 and returned to France with his family.

Notes and references

External links

1962 births
Living people
Sportspeople from Lot-et-Garonne
French people of Italian descent
French rugby league players
French rugby union players
Rugby union centres
SU Agen Lot-et-Garonne players
Saracens F.C. players
Barbarian F.C. players
World Rugby Hall of Fame inductees
France international rugby union players